Cyril Harley (10 October 1910 – 2 December 1950) was a former Australian rules footballer who played with Footscray in the Victorian Football League (VFL).

Notes

External links 
		

1910 births
1950 deaths
Australian rules footballers from Victoria (Australia)
Western Bulldogs players